The 2008 edition of R League (the Korea Professional Football Reserve League for the reserve teams of the top football clubs in South Korea) was held during K League season. Since 2008 season, Daegu FC and Daejeon Citizen participated for the first time.

Incheon United won the competition by defeating Pohang Steelers in final on penalties on 23 October 2008.

League standing

Central League

Southern League

Championship playoff

Semifinals

Final
First leg

Second leg

External links
 K-League website 

R League seasons
2008 in South Korean football